Lime Kiln, or variants, may refer to:

 Lime kiln, a kiln to produce quicklime 
 Limekiln, Pennsylvania, an unincorporated community in the U.S.
 Limekiln Lake, Inlet, New York, U.S.
 Limekilns, a village in Fife, Scotland
 Limekilns, New South Wales, a rural locality in Australia
 Lime Kiln Halt railway station, Isle of Man
 Lime Kiln Mountain, in the Ozarks of Missouri, U.S.
 Lime Kilns (Eureka, Utah), an historic site in Utah, U.S.
 Lime Kilns (Lincoln, Rhode Island), an historic site in Rhode Island, U.S.

See also

List of lime kilns
List of lime kilns in the United States
 Lime Kiln Creek, a stream in California, United States
 Lime Kiln Light, a light house in Washington, United States
 Lime Kiln Middle School, in Howard County, Maryland, United States
 Lime Kiln Point State Park, Washington, United States
 Lime Kiln Road, Dutchess County, New York, United States
 Limekiln State Park, California, United States
 Lime Kiln Valley AVA, a wine growing region of California
Lime Kiln Field Day, a 1913 silent film rediscovered in 2014